Shadow of the Sun is an album by psychedelic punk duo Moon Duo. The group is a side project of psychedelic-space-drone rock band Wooden Shjips.

References

2015 albums